Darreh Eshgaft (also known as Dareshgaft-e ‘Olyā and Darreh Eshkaft-e Bālā) is a village in Margha Rural District, in the Central District of Izeh County, Khuzestan Province, Iran. At the 2006 census, its population was 95, in 15 families.

References 

Populated places in Izeh County